Shaye is a musical group.

Shaye may also refer to:
 Shaye, Iran
 Shaye (name), and persons with the name